Mike Lunsford is the former chief executive of SK Planet, Inc., the former interim chief executive of Shopkick, Inc., the former executive vice president and interim chief executive officer of RealNetworks, the former chief executive officer of Rhapsody, and the former president and interim chief executive officer of Earthlink.

American technology chief executives
Year of birth missing (living people)
Living people
Place of birth missing (living people)
21st-century American businesspeople